Furstenfeld may refer to:

 Fürstenfeld, a city in Austria
 Fürstenfeld (song), a song by S.T.S.
 Jeremy Furstenfeld, drummer for Blue October
 Justin Furstenfeld, singer for Blue October

German-language surnames
Germanic-language surnames